Ice Hockey Iceland is the governing body of ice hockey in Iceland.

Competitions
Men's
Icelandic Men's Hockey League

Women's
Icelandic Women's Hockey League

National teams

Iceland men
 Iceland men's national ice hockey team
 Iceland men's national under 20 ice hockey team

Iceland Women
 Iceland women's national ice hockey team

Icelandic Ice Hockey Player of the Year

Men's
 2004 – Jónas Breki Magnússon
 2008 – Jón Benedikt Gíslason
 2011 – Björn Már Jakobsson
 2012 – Ólafur Hrafn Björnsson
 2013 – Ingvar Þór Jónsson
 2014 – Björn Róbert Sigurðsson
 2015 – Úlfar Jón Andrésson
 2016 – Andri Már Mikaelsson
 2017 – Robbie Sigurðsson
 2018 – Jóhann Már Leifsson
 2019 – Róbert Freyr Pálsson
 2020 – Jóhann Már Leifsson

Women's
 2004 – Anna Sonja Ágústdóttir
 2008 – Flosrún Vaka Jóhannesdóttir
 2011 – Sarah Smiley
 2012 – Anna Sonja Ágústsdóttir
 2013 – Jónína Margrét Guðbjartsdóttir
 2014 – Linda Brá Sveinsdóttir
 2015 – Guðrún Marín Viðarsdóttir
 2016 – Flosrún Vaka Jóhannesdóttir
 2017 – Eva María Karvelsdóttir
 2018 – Silvía Rán Björgvinsdóttir
 2019 – Kolbrún María Garðarsdóttir
 2020 – Sunna Björgvinsdóttir

References

External links
 Iceland at IIHF.com
 Ice Hockey Federation Website

Ice hockey in Iceland
Ice hockey governing bodies in Europe
International Ice Hockey Federation members
Ice Hockey